Lake Manakiki is a reservoir in the U.S. state of Wisconsin. Panfish can be found here.

"Ma-na-ki-ki" is a name derived from the Chippewa language meaning "maple forest".

References

Lakes of Wood County, Wisconsin
Lakes of Wisconsin